Melaleuca hnatiukii is a plant in the myrtle family, Myrtaceae and is endemic to the south of Western Australia. It is a medium to large shrub with arching branches, prickly tipped leaves and creamy-white heads of flowers in spring or early summer.

Description

The flowers are white or cream-coloured and arranged in heads or short spikes on the ends of branches which continue to grow after flowering and sometimes in the upper leaf axils. There are five bundles of stamens around the flower, each with 5 to 8 stamens.

Taxonomy and naming
Melaleuca hnatiukii was first formally described in 1999 by Lyndley Craven in Australian Systematic Botany from a specimen collected near Scaddan. The specific epithet (hnatiukii) honours Roger Hnatiuk, a Canadian-Australian botanist.

Distribution and habitat
Melaleuca hnatiukii occurs in the Scaddan and Esperance districts in the Esperance Plains and Mallee biogeographic regions. It grows in sandy soils in heath near salt lakes.

Conservation status
Melaleuca hnatiukii is listed as "not threatened" by the Government of Western Australia Department of Parks and Wildlife.

References

hnatiukii
Plants described in 1999
Endemic flora of Western Australia
Taxa named by Lyndley Craven